Sex is a song by American heavy metal band Mötley Crüe. It was originally thought to be the first single from their intended tenth studio album, but was disproved when bassist Nikki Sixx announced that there would not be another studio album before the end of their final tour.

Track list

Sex

Personnel

Members

Vince Neil: Lead vocal
Nikki Sixx: Bass guitar
Mick Mars: Guitars 
Tommy Lee: Drums

Lyrics

Tommy Lee:	 Composer
Mick Mars:	 Composer
James Michael: Composer
Nikki Sixx: Composer

Charts

References

2012 singles
Mötley Crüe songs
2012 songs
Songs written by Nikki Sixx
Songs written by Mick Mars
Songs written by James Michael
Songs written by Tommy Lee